Poso Kota is a district in Indonesia. It is located in the Poso Regency of Central Sulawesi. Along with the neighboring districts of North and South Poso Kota, this district makes up the capital region of Poso Regency, Poso, covering  with a population of 48,323 in mid 2021.

With a population of 24,145 inhabitants, and a population density of 2,139 per km2 in 2020, Poso Kota is the most densely-populated and most populous district in Poso Regency. With an area of only , Poso Kota is also the smallest district in the regency, with only 0.16% of the total area of Poso Regency.

Administrative division 
As of 2020, Poso Kota District consists of seven administrative villages, namely:
 Central Kayamanya
 East Gebangrejo
 Gebangrejo
 Kayamanya
 Moengko
 Moengko Baru
 West Gebangrejo

References

Further reading

Districts of Central Sulawesi